James Lloyd  (born 1861) was a Welsh international footballer. He was part of the Wales national football team, playing 1 match on 7 April 1879 against Scotland.

At club level, he played for Wrexham and Newtown.

Honours

Wrexham

Welsh Cup
Runners-up:1878-79

See also
 List of Wales international footballers (alphabetical)

References

1861 births
Welsh footballers
Wales international footballers
Wrexham A.F.C. players
Newtown A.F.C. players
Place of birth missing
Year of death missing
Association footballers not categorized by position